Albert Chua (born 1968) is a Singaporean civil servant and diplomat who served as Permanent Representative of Singapore to the United Nations from 2011 to 2013.

He was educated at Raffles Institution, the University of East Anglia (BA, English Literature, 1990) and Harvard Kennedy School at Harvard University (MPA, 2000). He served as Singaporean High Commissioner to Australia from March 2008 to June 2011, and as Principal Private Secretary to then Senior Minister Goh Chok Tong from 2004 to 2006. He was appointed Permanent Secretary, (Foreign Affairs) in April 2022, having formerly been Permanent Secretary (Sustainability and the Environment).

He received a gold Public Administration Medal in 2017.

References

1968 births
Living people
Permanent secretaries of Singapore
Raffles Institution alumni
Alumni of the University of East Anglia
Harvard Kennedy School alumni
Permanent Representatives of Singapore to the United Nations